Bridge College is a specialist college in Manchester, England, for students aged 16–25 with disabilities, complex needs and autism. It is on the Openshaw campus of The Manchester College. It is run by the Together Trust charity and has a maximum of 95 students.

References

External links
Bridge College at Ofsted website, with links to all reports

Special schools in Manchester
Further education colleges in Greater Manchester